Tomás Romero Pereira (October 4, 1886 – August 12, 1982) was President of Paraguay from May 4, 1954, to August 15, 1954.

Associated with the Colorado Party and General Alfredo Stroessner

He was a member of the Colorado Party. He came to power as a result of a military coup, led by General Alfredo Stroessner, which began on May 4, 1954, and lasted for three days.

President of Paraguay

As a compromise between the military who led the coup and the Colorado Party who was in power, he took office May 8, 1954. An election was held on July 11, 1954, with Stroessner as the sole candidate.

Resignation

On August 15, 1954, Romero handed over the presidency to Alfredo Stroessner who then became the dictator of Paraguay for 35 years.

Death

He died on 12 August 1982 at the age of 95.

References

1886 births
1982 deaths
National University of La Plata alumni
Paraguayan architects
People from Encarnación, Paraguay
Presidents of Paraguay
Colorado Party (Paraguay) politicians